André Hoffmann (born 31 May 1958) is a Swiss billionaire businessman, environmentalist and philanthropist.

The great-grandson of Fritz Hoffmann-La Roche who founded the drug company Roche Holding in 1896, he currently is the vice-chairman of the company. As of November 2020, his estimated net worth is US$5.71 billion

As a philanthropist, he has been an advocate for sustainability and environmental protection, serving as International Vice-president of the World Wide Fund for Nature (WWF) from 2007 to 2017.

Early life
Born on 31 May 1958 in Basel, Switzerland, André Hoffmann is the son of Daria Hoffmann-Razumovsky and Luc Hoffmann, a conservationist and philanthropist.

He studied economics at the University of St. Gallen, and holds an MBA from INSEAD, completed in 1990.

Career

In 1991, André Hoffmann joined Nestlé UK. Three years later, he established a family office specialized in wealth management.

In 1996, he became a member of the board of Roche holding, the world's second-largest pharmaceutical company, established by his grandfather.

He currently owns 1.5% of the company and serves as Vice Chairman  - a position he has held since 2006.

He also serves on the board of Genentech, a fully owned subsidiary based in San Francisco, California.

An early investor in the Maryland-based start-up Inovalon, which manages and analyses healthcare data, he served as its Independent Director.

He is a member of the Club of Rome, a member of the board of Trustees of the World Economic Forum, a member the Center for the Fourth Industrial Revolution in San Francisco, and a member of the board of SystemIQ, a company that intends to “drive positive disruption in economic systems”.

Philanthropy

Nature preservation 

André Hoffmann is an environmentalist, involved in a number of nonprofit organizations and initiatives related to sustainability and nature conservation.

In 1998, he joined the WWF and served as vice-president of the organization from 2007 to 2017.

Since 2010, he has served as president of the MAVA Foundation, a major foundation in the field of nature preservation.

In 2016, he becomes President of Fondation Tour du Valat, a French research institute dedicated to Mediterranean wetland conservation.

He has also served on the boards of Wetlands International, Global Footprint Network and FIBA.

Education 
In August 2018, Hoffmann and his wife Rosalie made a €40 million commitment to INSEAD, establishing the Hoffmann Global Institute for Business and Society. He is currently the  chairman of its advisory board.

Other board memberships and positions 

Hoffmann is also:

 A member of the Club of Rome
 Vice-chairman of the Board at the Venture Foundation
 Chairman of the Board of the Capitals Coalition Board
 A member of The Royal Institute of International Affairs and Senior Adviser at Chatham House, its think tank

Personal life
Hoffmann is married to Rosalie Coombe-Tennant and has four children.

He owns several vineyards. In 2017, he purchased the domain Jayer Gilles in Burgundy, which became Hoffmann Jayer, with an emphasis on environment and nature preservation. He also owns Domain Pierre Latine in Yvorne, Switzerland and domain Alpamanta in Argentina.

References

1958 births
Living people
Swiss billionaires
Hoffmann-La Roche people
University of St. Gallen alumni
INSEAD alumni
Andre